Santi Bernardo e Margherita a Fonseca is a former Roman Catholic church and convent located on Via San Giuseppe dei Nudi and Vico San Margherita a Fonseca, adjacent to the deconsecrated convent of the Santissimo Sacramento in the quartiere of Stella of Naples, Italy.

History
The church was built in 1634, and was acquired by the nuns from the adjacent convent. The structure underwent refurbishment in the early 18th century. The church was restructured between 1725 and 1732 by Giovanni Battista Nauclerio.

After the suppression of the religious orders in 1809, the convent was used as a jail. In 1820, it was given to the Archconfraternity della Vita. In 1859, it was conceded to the Order of Knights Hospitaller, who now maintain a hospital at the convent. The interiors still retain some of the late-Baroque architecture decoration, including stucco-work.

References

Roman Catholic churches in Naples
Baroque architecture in Naples
18th-century Roman Catholic church buildings in Italy
Roman Catholic churches completed in 1732